Finnbogi Ísakson (born Isaksen, February 7, 1943 – September 7, 2005) was a Faroese journalist, writer, and politician for the Republic party.

Life and career
Ísakson was born in Klaksvík, the son of the fishing captain Jógvan Isaksen (died 1948) and his wife Anna née Wolles (died 1971). His involvement in media included radio, television, and newspapers. He served as a member of the Faroese Parliament from 1966 to 1984 and from 1990 to 2002, and he was a member of the Cabinet of the Faroe Islands from 1975 to 1979, in 1989, and again from 1993 to 1994.

Ísakson worked at Faroese Radio from 1963 to 1974. He was the second-youngest person ever elected to the Faroese Parliament, at the age of 23 in 1966 as a representative for the Norðoyar district. He later served as the editor of the newspaper Tíðindablaðið from 1974 to 1975. Ísakson worked freelance from 1975 to 1984, overlapping with his term as minister of education, housing, and transport in Atli Dam's second administration from 1975 to 1979. During this time, Johan Simonsen served as Ísakson's deputy in the parliament. In 1984, Ísakson was reelected to the parliament. That same year he was also hired by Faroese Television, where he worked until 1988. Ísakson served as a deputy for Jóngerð Purkhús in the parliament from 1989 to 1990. Ísakson was once again elected to the parliament in 1990 as a representative for the South Streymoy district in 1990. He served as the minister of finance in 1989, and then again from 1993 to 1994. He was editor of 14. september, the paper of the Republic party, from 1991 to 1993. From 1998 to 2002 he was speaker of the Faroese Parliament, but he did not run as a candidate after this.

Finnbogi Ísakson became seriously ill in the summer of 2005, and he died in Tórshavn on September 7 that year at the age of 62.

Parliamentary committees
1994–1998: member of the Finance Committee
1994–1998: member of the Tax Committee
1990–1993: member of the Finance Committee
1974–1975: member of the Tax Committee
1972–1974: member of the Finance Committee
1969–1970: member of the Ports and Roads Committee
1966–1969: member of the Social Committee
1966–1970: member of the Schools Committee

Selected works
1972: , humor
1983: Tilburðir í okkara øld, vol. 1
1987: Tilburðir í okkara øld, vol. 2
1988: Aftur og fram, vol. 1
1989: Aftur og fram, vol. 2
1990: Aftur og fram, vol. 3
1991: Aftur og fram, vol. 4
1995: Tilburðir í okkara øld, vol. 3
2005: Sverri kongur, translated from Norwegian

References

Further reading
 Dahl, Árni. 2002. Løgtingið 150. Hátíðarrit. Vol. 2. Tórshavn, p. 269.
 Løgtingsins limir. 1991. Árbók fyri Føroyar 1991. Tórshavn: Hagstova Føroya, p. 73.
 Løgtingsnevndir og tingmannaráð. 1995. Árbók fyri Føroyar 1995. Tórshavn: Hagstova Føroya, p. 78.

Government ministers of the Faroe Islands
Speakers of the Løgting
Faroese writers
Faroese journalists
People from Klaksvík
1943 births
2005 deaths
20th-century Danish journalists